Tinlot is a municipality of Wallonia located in the province of Liège, Belgium. 

On January 1, 2006 Tinlot had a total population of 2,346. The total area is 37.12 km² which gives a population density of 63 inhabitants per km².

The municipality consists of the following districts: Abée, Fraiture, Ramelot, Seny, and Soheit-Tinlot.

See also
 List of protected heritage sites in Tinlot

References

External links
 

Municipalities of Liège Province